Following is a list of bays, coves and roadsteads in France.

Bays in Metropolitan France

Bays in Overseas France 

Bays_of_France
France
France